The versit Consortium was a multivendor initiative founded by Apple Computer, AT&T, IBM and Siemens in the early 1990s in order to create Personal Data Interchange (PDI) technology, open specifications for exchanging personal data over the Internet, wired and wireless connectivity and Computer Telephony Integration (CTI). The Consortium started a number of projects to deliver open specifications aimed at creating industry standards.

Computer Telephony Integration

One of the most ambitious projects of the Consortium was the Versit CTI Encyclopedia (VCTIE), a 3,000 page, 6 volume set of specifications defining how computer and telephony systems are to interact and become interoperable. The Encyclopedia was built on existing technologies and specifications such as ECMA's call control specifications, TSAPI and industry expertise of the core technical team. The volumes are:

 Volume 1, Concepts & Terminology
 Volume 2, Configurations & Landscape
 Volume 3, Telephony Feature Set
 Volume 4, Call Flow Scenarios
 Volume 5, CTI Protocols
 Volume 6, Versit TSAPI

Appendices include:

 Versit TSAPI header file
 Protocol 1 ASN.1 description
 Protocol 2 ASN.1 description
 Versit Server Mapper Interface header file
 Versit TSDI header file

The core Versit CTI Encyclopedia technical team was composed of David H. Anderson and Marcus W. Fath from IBM, Frédéric Artru and Michael Bayer from Apple Computer, James L. Knight and Steven Rummel from AT&T (then Lucent Technologies), Tom Miller from Siemens, and consultants Ellen Feaheny and Charles Hudson. Upon completion, the Versit CTI Encyclopedia was transferred to the ECTF and has been adopted in the form of ECTF C.001. This model represents the basis for the ECTF's call control efforts.

Though the Versit CTI Encyclopedia ended up influencing many products, there was one full compliant implementation of the specifications that was brought to market: Odisei, a French company founded by team member Frédéric Artru developed the IntraSwitch IP-PBX. Odisei was later acquired by semiconductor company 8x8, which deployed the IntraSwitch technology as the second largest standalone U.S. VoIP service provider.

Personal Data Interchange

In 1996, all rights to these technologies were transferred to the Internet Mail Consortium, an organization founded by Paul Hoffman (VPNC), which continued to maintain the standards until 2002, when the IMC ceased its activities.

External links
 Minčių Sodas - Archive - Thinking Powerfully - Number 184 (Andrius Kulikauskas' reasoning for opposing XML as the format for )
 CompTIA ECTF group - Repository of the Versit CTI Encyclopedia
 www.imc.org/pdi — main PDI standards, original 1996's description of vCard and vCalendar.

Computer networking